Bramley Mountain is a mountain located in the Catskill Mountains of New York east-northeast of Delhi. Bovina Mountain is located northeast of Bramley Mountain. The mountain is the former location of fire observation tower, which was removed in 1975. The family that purchased and removed it from the mountain has kept the tower in storage since. In January 2020, Friends of Bramley Mountain group was formed. The family plans to give the tower to the group so it can be placed back at its original location.

History
Bramley Mountain formerly had a fire observation tower at its peak. The tower was closed at the end of the 1970 season. In 1975, the tower was sold for $50 and removed from the mountaintop. The family that purchased and removed it from the mountain has kept the tower in storage. In 2008, the NYC Department of Environmental Protection (DEP) acquired the parcel that includes Bramley Mountain. Then in 2016, the DEP allowed the Catskill Mountain Club to build a trail to the summit. In January 2020, Friends of Bramley Mountain group was formed. The family plans to give the tower to the group so it can be placed back at its original location.

References

Mountains of Delaware County, New York
Mountains of New York (state)